The Steinitz Memorial was a blitz chess tournament held from May 15 to May 17, 2020, in honor of the first recognized world chess champion Wilhelm Steinitz. The prize pool was €30,000.

Grandmasters participated in the tournament, among men Magnus Carlsen, Alexander Grischuk, Bu Xiangzhi, Peter Svidler, Jeffery Xiong, Daniil Dubov, Shakhriyar Mamedyarov, Lê Quang Liêm, Anton Korobov, David Antón Guijarro; among women are Ekaterina Lagno, Lei Tingjie, Alexandra Kosteniuk, Tan Zhongyi, Antoaneta Stefanova, Marie Sebag, Zhansaya Abdumalik, Elisabeth Pähtz, Deysi Cori.

The tournament was held on the technical site of Chess24.com. The winner among men was the current world chess champion Magnus Carlsen, among women — Ekaterina Lagno.

References

Links 
 Carlsen and Lagno win FIDE Online Steinitz Memorial

Chess competitions
Chess memorial tournaments
2020 in chess